Norridgewock is a town in Somerset County, Maine, United States. The population was 3,278 at the 2020 census.

History

Native Americans

Situated on the New England and Acadia border, which New France defined as the Kennebec River, the area was once territory of the Norridgewock Indians, a band of the Abenaki nation. Their village was located at Old Point, now part of Madison.

English colonists suspected Father Sebastien Rale (or Rasle), the French missionary at the village since 1694, of abetting tribal hostilities against British settlements during the French and Indian Wars. During Father Rale's War, soldiers left Fort Richmond (now Richmond) in whaleboats until they reached Taconic Falls (now Winslow), then marched quietly to Norridgewock Village, arriving on August 23, 1724. Battle of Norridgewock was "sharp, short and decisive," leaving 26 warriors slain, 14 wounded and 150 survivors fleeing to Quebec, Canada. Father Rale was among the dead.

Subsequent history

The British settled the area in 1773, then called Norridgewock Plantation. In 1775, Benedict Arnold and his troops marched through on their way to the Battle of Quebec.

The town was incorporated on June 18, 1788. It became county seat of Somerset County in 1809, with a courthouse built in 1820 and remodeled in 1847, although the county seat would be moved to Skowhegan in 1871. Wooden logs were floated down the Kennebec River. A sawmill was built to manufacture the region's abundant hardwoods, used in local factories to make carriages and furniture. Norridgewock also had a gristmill and granite works. Built in 1849 and replaced in 1929, the  Norridgewock Covered Bridge across the Kennebec River was the second longest covered bridge in Maine after the  Bangor Covered Bridge, which was built in 1846 across the Penobscot River to Brewer. The Eaton School was organized by Hamlin F. Eaton in 1856 and incorporated in 1874 " ... for the promotion of literature, science and morality." Its Second Empire building, designed by architect Charles F. Douglas of Lewiston, later became Somerset Grange #18. In 1988, it was listed on the National Register of Historic Places.

Geography

Norridgewock is drained by the Sandy River, Mill Stream and Kennebec River.

The village is located at the junction of U.S. Routes 2 and 201A with Maine State routes 8 and 139. Norridgewock borders the towns of Madison to the north, Skowhegan to the east, Fairfield and Smithfield to the south, and Mercer and Starks to the west.

Demographics

2010 census

As of the census of 2010, there were 3,367 people, 1,378 households, and 984 families living in the town. The racial makeup of the town was 97.2% White, 0.5% African American, 0.3% Native American, 0.2% Asian, 0.2% from other races, and 1.6% from two or more races. Hispanic or Latino of any race were 0.5% of the population.

There were 1,378 households, of which 30.3% had children under the age of 18 living with them, 55.5% were married couples living together, 10.1% had a female householder with no husband present, 5.8% had a male householder with no wife present, and 28.6% were non-families. 21.8% of all households were made up of individuals, and 7.9% had someone living alone who was 65 years of age or older. The average household size was 2.44 and the average family size was 2.78.

The median age in the town was 42.7 years. 22.3% of residents were under the age of 18; 7.2% were between the ages of 18 and 24; 24.4% were from 25 to 44; 31% were from 45 to 64; and 15.1% were 65 years of age or older. The gender makeup of the town was 50.0% male and 50.0% female.

2000 census

As of the census of 2000, there were 3,294 people, 1,285 households, and 953 families living in the town. The racial makeup of the town was 98.36% White, 0.30% Black or African American, 0.46% Native American, 0.12% Asian, 0.18% from other races, and 0.58% from two or more races. Hispanic or Latino of any race were 0.36% of the population.

There were 1,285 households, out of which 35.8% had children under the age of 18 living with them, 60.6% were married couples living together, 9.1% had a female householder with no husband present, and 25.8% were non-families. 18.8% of all households were made up of individuals, and 8.2% had someone living alone who was 65 years of age or older.  The average household size was 2.56 and the average family size was 2.90.

In the town, the population was spread out, with 26.3% under the age of 18, 6.3% from 18 to 24, 30.1% from 25 to 44, 25.7% from 45 to 64, and 11.5% who were 65 years of age or older.  The median age was 38 years. For every 100 females, there were 97.5 males.  For every 100 females age 18 and over, there were 94.9 males.

The median income for a household in the town was $35,679, and the median income for a family was $41,536. Males had a median income of $31,800 versus $20,508 for females. The per capita income for the town was $17,325.  About 15.1% of families and 16.3% of the population were below the poverty line, including 24.4% of those under age 18 and 12.2% of those age 65 or over.

Site of interest

 Norridgewock Historical Society & Museum

Notable people 

 Nathan Abbott, legal scholar, professor
 Daniel W. Ames, state legislator
 Rebecca Sophia Clarke (Sophie May), children's author
 Nathan Haskell Dole, editor, translator, author
 Stephen D. Lindsey, US congressman
 Sebastien Rale (or Rasle), Jesuit missionary
 Minot Judson Savage, minister
 Charles G. Sawtelle, U.S. Army brigadier general
 Cullen Sawtelle, US congressman
 Franklin J. Sawtelle, architect
 Ellen G. White, American Christian writer and co-founder of the Seventh-day Adventist Church
 Niram Withee, Wisconsin businessman and politician

References

External links

 Town of Norridgewock, Maine
 Norridgewock Free Public Library

 
Towns in Somerset County, Maine